Davide Farolini (born Parma, 19 May 1992) is an Italian rugby union player. His usual position is as a Fullback and he currently plays for Valorugby Emilia in Top12.

References 

It's Rugby England Profile
Eurosport Profile

1992 births
Living people
Italian rugby union players
Rugby union fullbacks
Valorugby Emilia players